Ellerslie School (founded 1877) is a school in Auckland, New Zealand.

Ellerslie School may also refer to:

 Ellerslie Girls' High School (founded 1898), Cape Town, South Africa
 Ellerslie (founded 1922), a girls' school in Great Malvern, Worcestershire, United Kingdom, now part of Malvern College

See also
 Ellerslie (disambiguation)